"Stupid Feelings" is a song by English producer and DJ 220 Kid and American pop band LANY. It was released on 6 August 2021 via Polydor Records.

Content
In a press release, "Stupid Feelings" is "a musical juxtaposition with heartfelt and emotive lyrics from LANY in contrast with a light, uplifting and progressive beat delivered by 220 Kid." The song is written in the key of F♯ minor, with a tempo of 124 beats per minute.

Credits and personnel
Credits adapted from AllMusic.

 220 Kid – primary artist, producer, vocals, composer
 Conor Blake – composer  mixing
 Samuel Brennan – composer
 Mike Crossey – vocal producer
 Tom Hollings – composer
 Paul Klein – composer, vocals
 LANY – primary artist
 Jordan Shaw – composer
 Edward Sokolowski – mastering engineer
 Billen Ted – mixing, producer

Charts

Weekly charts

Year-end charts

References

2021 singles
2021 songs
LANY songs
Polydor Records singles